Brent Gabriël (born 27 January 1999) is a Belgian professional footballer who plays as a goalkeeper for Challenger Pro League club Beveren.

References

1999 births
Sportspeople from Sint-Niklaas
Footballers from East Flanders
Living people
Association football goalkeepers
Belgian footballers
Club Brugge KV players
S.K. Beveren players
F.C.V. Dender E.H. players
Belgian Pro League players
Challenger Pro League players